Karin Björnsdotter Wanngård (born 29 June 1975), is a Swedish politician who has served as mayor of Stockholm since 2022 and who previously served in that capacity from 2014 to 2018. She is a member of the Social Democrats, and has been city councillor of Stockholm Municipality since 1994.

Wanngård was appointed leader of the Social Democrats in Stockholm Municipality in 2011, and served as the city's leader of the opposition until 2014. Following the 2014 municipal election, Wanngård formed a coalition consisting of her own Social Democrats, the Green Party, the Left Party, and the Feminist Initiative, which together held a majority in the city council.

In early 2017, Wanngård announced her coal usage elimination goal for Stockholm to be complete by 2022. She became one of sixteen women who lead large cities that address climate change.

References

External links 
Official website.

1975 births
Living people
Mayors of Stockholm
21st-century Swedish politicians
Women in Stockholm
Swedish women in politics
21st-century Swedish women politicians